Pastorelli is a surname. Notable people with the surname include:

 Ilenia Pastorelli (born 1985), Italian actress
 Nicky Pastorelli (born 1983), Dutch race car driver
 Robert Pastorelli (1954–2004), American actor
 Romain Pastorelli (born 1983), French professional footballer